Kenshin is a Japanese masculine given name. It may refer to:

Fiction
 Rurouni Kenshin, a manga series
 Rurouni Kenshin (1996 TV series), the first animated adaptation of the manga
 Rurouni Kenshin (2023 TV series), the second animated adaptation of the manga
 Rurouni Kenshin (film), the 2012 film adaptation of the manga
 , the main character on Rurouni Kenshin
 Kenshin Dragon Quest: Yomigaerishi Densetsu no Ken, a Dragon Quest video-game

People
 , Japanese historical figure
 , Japanese baseball pitcher
  (1961–1987, aka Kenshin), Japanese haiku poet

Japanese masculine given names